The West Blockhouse Point Beacons are three leading light beacons, they perform the same function as a lighthouse and are situated on the promontory to the west side of the entrance to Milford Haven, and lie about a mile north-east of St. Ann's Head in Pembrokeshire, Wales. The lights are accessed by ladders which extend up the columns through an opening in the platform. Each column carries a steel daymark painted black and white. 

There is also a leading light beacon on the cliff below West Blockhouse Fort, set up by Trinity House engineers in 1957.

The beacons are operated by the Milford Haven Conservancy Board and are approached via Dale then the road to St Ann's Head, turning left into Maryborough Farm Road, and then taking a right turn.

See also

 List of lighthouses in Wales

References

Lighthouses completed in 1957
Lighthouses in Pembrokeshire